Percina brucethompsoni is a species of freshwater ray-finned fish, a darter from the subfamily Etheostomatinae, part of the family Percidae, which also contains the perches, ruffes and pikeperches. It is endemic to the Ouachita River system in the Ouachita Mountains in Arkansas.  When breeding, in the Spring, they are normally found in riffles and fast runs with gravel or pebble substrates at depths of around  They live in  deeper pools during the rest of the year.

Etymology
The specific name honors the American ichthyologist Dr. Bruce A. Thompson (1946-2007).

See also 
 Arkansas saddled darter: darter endemic to the White River in Arkansas and Missouri
 Paleback darter: darter endemic to the Caddo River in Arkansas

References

brucethompsoni
Taxa named by Henry W. Robinson
Taxa named by Robert Cashner
Taxa named by Thomas J. Near
Fish described in 2014
Ouachita River